Marth may refer to:

 Marth, Thuringia, Germany

People with the surname
 Albert Marth (1828–1897), German astronomer
 Christophe Marth (born 1980), French rugby player
 Frank Marth (born 1922), American actor
 Tommy Marth (1978–2012), American saxophonist who performed with The Killers

Other uses
 Marth (Fire Emblem), a video game character
 Marth (lunar crater), a crater on the Moon
 Marth (Martian crater), a crater on Mars